Badar Nasib Saleem Bamasila (born 25 January 1992), commonly known as Badar Nasib, is an Omani footballer who plays for Dhofar S.C.S.C. in the Oman Professional League.

Personal life
Badar is the younger brother of fellow Dhofar S.C.S.C. defender Fahad Nasib Bamasila.

Club career
On 16 January 2015, he signed a six-month contract with 2014–15 Oman Professional League winners Al-Nahda Club.

Club career statistics

International career
Badar is part of the first team squad of the Oman national football team. He was selected for the national team for the first time in 2011. He made his first appearance for Oman on 25 December 2013 against Bahrain in the 2014 WAFF Championship. He has made an appearance in the 2014 WAFF Championship and has represented the national team in the 2014 FIFA World Cup qualification and the 2015 AFC Asian Cup qualification.

References

External links
 
 
 Badar Nasib Bamasila at Goal.com
 
 

1992 births
Living people
Omani footballers
Oman international footballers
Association football midfielders
Dhofar Club players
Al-Nahda Club (Oman) players
Oman Professional League players
Footballers at the 2010 Asian Games
Asian Games competitors for Oman